Arthur Lee Maye (December 11, 1934 – July 17, 2002) was an American Major League Baseball player. He played eleven seasons in the majors as an outfielder for the Milwaukee Braves (1959–1965), Houston Astros (1965–1966), Cleveland Indians (1967–1969), Washington Senators (1969–1970), and Chicago White Sox (1970–1971).

Maye was also well known as a rhythm & blues singer.  He was the lead singer of the Los Angeles-based doo-wop group Arthur Lee Maye and the Crowns in the 1950s.

Career overview

Baseball
In a 13-year Major League Baseball career Maye played for the Milwaukee Braves, Houston Astros, Cleveland Indians, Washington Senators, and the Chicago White Sox.   From 1961 to 1966, and again in 1969, he started in more than half of his team's games, with a high of 133 games started in 1964.  Maye was also used quite often as a pinch-hitter during his 13-season career.

In 1964, playing for the Milwaukee Braves, Maye had personal career-highs in almost every category; including 153 games played, 74 RBI, and a .304 batting average.  He also led the National League with 44 doubles.

Other career highlights include:
hit 2 home runs vs. the Chicago Cubs (August 8, 1962)
a pair of 5-hit games...4 singles and a doubles vs. the Philadelphia Phillies (September 27, 1964) and three singles, a double, and a home run vs. the Chicago Cubs (August 11, 1966)
eight 4-hit games, including two singles and two doubles, with four runs scored vs. the New York Yankees (April 21, 1970)

Maye's career totals include 1,288 games played, 1,109 hits, 94 home runs, 419 RBI, and a lifetime batting average of .274.

Music
Maye sang in a tenor and falsetto. Music journalist and critic Phil Milstein called his singing "deft" and "authoritative.". Maye recorded on over a dozen labels to include Modern, Tower, Specialty, ABC-Paramount, and Buddah, and opened a Hollywood Bowl show featuring Jerry Butler, Billy Stewart, and Barbara Mason.  Maye told Milstein, "I am the best singing athlete that ever lived. I am not bragging. It's just a fact."

Early baseball and music careers
Arthur Lee Maye's dual career began at Los Angeles' Jefferson High School. Here he sang with Jesse Belvin and future members of the Platters, the Penguins, and the Coasters. Maye starred in baseball for both Jefferson High and local semi-pro teams. Milwaukee Braves scout Johnny Moore not only saw his potential as a hitter with line drive power but clocked him in the 100-yard dash at under 10-seconds.  Moore convinced the Braves to draft and sign him. Arthur Lee Maye later explained, "Baseball was my first love. I could always sing at fifty, but I couldn’t play baseball at fifty." He began his professional baseball career in 1954 with a Milwaukee Braves Pioneer League farm team in Boise, Idaho. At this time he also started his professional recording career. He joined Richard Berry and recorded  "The Fine One"  b/w  "Please  Please Baby" as the "5" Hearts on the Flair label (the company put the "5" in quotes as only three sang on the record). They next released "Sweet Thing b/w "Rock Bottom" under the name "Rams." Maye also sang the "di-di-di's" behind Richard Berry on the original "Louie Louie."

Minor League Baseball career and the Crowns
Maye played for the Braves minor league teams in Boise, Eau Claire, Yakima, Evansville, Jacksonville, Wichita, Austin, and Louisville.   He also formed the musical group The Crowns.  The Crowns had back to back LA area hits on the Modern label with "Truly" and "Love Me Always."  On the Specialty label in 1956, they sang their best known record, "Gloria."  They also had an important 1956 record on the DIG label titled "This is the Night for Love."   Maye said of his cross country stops, "I'd watch all of them, any entertainer when I was in a town. You learn from each other. My stage presence wasn't polished, so I'd go to learn how to get my stage presence from the other top guys who did it for a living".   In 1959 he batted .339 with 17 home runs for the Braves top Louisville farm team and broke into the Major Leagues.

Major League Baseball career
Maye hit over .300 in his first two seasons of Major League Baseball.  A back injury and respiratory illness slowed his progress in 1961 and 1962.  In 1964, Maye hit .304, scored 96 runs, drove in 74 runs, and led the National League in doubles with 44; meanwhile, his solo album Halfway Out of Love sold over 500,000 copies. A 1965 ankle injury hurt his season and career.  He was traded to the Houston Astros during the 1965 season.  Playing his 1966 home games in the Astrodome, he hit .288 with 9 home runs.  Huey Meax managed his music career during this time.  Meaux got him studio time with JAMIE and regular bookings at popular Houston nightclubs. The Astros traded him to Cleveland before the 1967 season.  In 1968, the  year of the pitcher, Maye hit .281. Maye was traded to the Washington Senators during the 1969 season.  He had personality issues with Manager Ted Williams  but respected his knowledge and hit .290. He played his final year in 1971 with the White Sox, hitting .205.  All of his MLB career was during baseball's second deadball era.  Lee Maye said, "The greatest thrill is not getting to the major leagues. It's staying there.  I played 13 seasons when they had only 16 teams and I think that was a great accomplishment for me."

Baseball and music conflict
Arthur Lee Maye's baseball and music career often conflicted.  He sang under the name Arthur Lee Maye but played baseball under Lee Maye.  Another Lee May (Lee Andrew May) broke into Major League Baseball in 1965 and soon put up bigger home run and RBI numbers. Only one record credits his dual career.  A 1959 release "Will You Be Mine" on CASH had Lee Maye of the Milwaukee Braves on the label. Playing baseball full-time created a time lag problem. Maye said, "When I was playing baseball all the requisite hours, I was a year behind in music, and I never got a chance to catch up with the music trend that I should have been with. I truly was behind the time, and I acknowledge that. Baseball and singing collided".   He also knew that baseball prevented his going on tour to promote his songs.  "When you're playing baseball and singing it's a very tough career for both of those, because you have to be at both places at the same time of the year, and you can't do that".

Post-baseball career
Lee Maye tried for ten years after his playing career to find a job in organized baseball.  He failed, as few non-playing baseball jobs existed for blacks at the time. His outspoken views on racism in baseball angered its owners.  And Maye's artistic temperament sometimes clashed with teammates and coaches. Maye later worked with Amtrak until his retirement.

Music career revival
In the mid-1980s, Maye returned to the recording studio with Dave Antrel and his Antrel Records, recording "Moonlight" b/w "Happy and In Love."  "Moonlight" captured the later, early 1960s New York street corner sound. Arthur Lee Maye was very proud of "Moonlight."  "Moonlight" made several compilation CDs, played a role in the novel '64 Intruder, and gets airplay on doo-wop radio programs.  Maye had a European tour planned when he became stricken with liver cancer.

Death
Maye died at the age of 67 in Riverside, California of pancreatic cancer and is buried at Inglewood Park Cemetery in Inglewood, California.

See also
 List of Major League Baseball annual doubles leaders

References

Further reading

External links

Lee Maye at Baseball Almanac

1934 births
2002 deaths
20th-century African-American sportspeople
21st-century African-American people
African-American baseball players
Austin Braves players
Baseball players from Alabama
Boise Braves players
Boise Pilots players
Burials at Inglewood Park Cemetery
Chicago White Sox players
Cleveland Indians players
Deaths from cancer in California
Deaths from pancreatic cancer
Eau Claire Braves players
Evansville Braves players
The Flairs members
Hawaii Islanders players
Houston Astros players
Imperial Records artists
Jacksonville Braves players
Jamie Records artists
Jefferson High School (Los Angeles) alumni
Louisville Colonels (minor league) players
Major League Baseball outfielders
Milwaukee Braves players
Sportspeople from Tuscaloosa, Alabama
Washington Senators (1961–1971) players
Wichita Braves players
Yakima Bears players